Dharmarajyam is a collection of essays written by Malayalam language writer Vaikom Muhammad Basheer. These politically charged essays were written against the policies of the then Diwan of Travancore Sir C. P. Ramaswami Iyer. The book was published in 1938 and was Basheer's first published book. The book was banned by the Travancore government in the same year. It is said that Basheer himself got these printed and sold them at local shops and households, going on foot. Subsequently, he was jailed for two years for conspiring against the government. The book was re-released by DC Books in 2008.

References

External links
 Dharmarajyam at DC Books official site

Indian essay collections
1938 non-fiction books
Books about politics of India
Books by Vaikom Muhammad Basheer
DC Books books
20th-century Indian books